Little Rock Indian School (or LRIS) is an educational institution in Coastal Karnataka, India.  Started in 1982, the school has a population of 3500 students. The campus, spread out  is located in Brahmavar, on National Highway No. 66, 72 km north of the coastal city of Mangaluru.

History
Little Rock Indian School was founded by Dr. C.T Abraham in Chanthar, Brahmavar, in 1982. The school was entirely self-funded. It was the idea of Mr. Mathew C. Ninan, son-in-law of Dr.Abraham, to start an English medium school, as there were hardly any nearby in those days.  Dr. Abraham persisted with idea, and soon, Crossland College was set up in 1984, affiliated to Mangalore University. The Indian Theological Seminary and an orphanage, known as Heidi Home, were started on the same campus soon after.

Campus and student life

The campus is located in Chantar, brahmavara taluk, 4 km off of NH17. The campus hosts the school, administration block, a degree college, the Indian Theological Seminary, a bank, an orphanage, and hostels for the students of the school and the degree college.

In addition to emphasizing academics, the school also encourages the holistic development of the student arts and sports. The institution offers classes starting from play home to Class 12. The academic blocks are separate for the Kindergartens, Class 1-4, Class 5 and 6, Class 7 and 8, Class 9 and 10, and Class 11 and 12. The seating arrangement till class 4 is mixed, but as the students reach class 5, the boys and girls are made to sit separately.

Uniforms are required every school day. Saturday is generally an off day, but several activities like Art and Crafts Club, Music Club, Eco Club, Guides and Scouts, and NCC are conducted. The school also holds remedial classes on Saturday for the students who don't score well in their regular tests.

Alumni network 
An alumni website is under development called Little Rockers. 

LRIS had its first Silver Jubilee alumni reunion in December 2006.

Administration 
The management of the institute include:

Mr. Mathew C Ninan, who stepped down from Little Rock’s principal-ship after nearly 28 years, is now appointed as Director of the School.

Dr. John Thomas, an excellent English teacher teaching 10th 11th and 12th, is now the current Principal of the Little Rock Indian School.

Mr. Mathew C. Ninan   was the Principal of the Little Rock Indian School in Brahmavar, Udupi District in Karnataka. His wife, who is now Kindergarten Principal, is the daughter of the founder of the school. He is the recipient of the Kannada Rajyotsava Award for Education from the Udupi District in 2014.

Distinctions

1.Computer Literacy Excellence Award in 2002 instituted by the IT Ministry, Govt of India, for having the best IT facilities amongst the Schools in Karnataka State. The Award was presented by the Hon’ble President of India Dr. APJ Abdul Kalam on August 29, 2002, in New Delhi.

2.State Championship in 2003, 2004, 2012, and 2014 in Rural IT Quiz conducted by the IT ministry, Govt of Karnataka and TATA Consultancy Services, Bangalore.  Little Rock received the State Runners-up in 2006, 2007, and 2011. Once again the National Runners-up in 2012. The school has also won the national rural it quiz 2015.

3.Verbattle – Statewide English Debate Competition winners (Junior Category) - 2012.

4.National School Sanitation Award in 2012 (awarded to 100 select schools from all over India by the HRD Ministry, Govt of India)

5.Best School Award for the last 23 years consecutively from the Rotary Udupi, based on a General Knowledge Test conducted for the schools of Udupi District.

6.Little Rock has conducted three international conferences – in 2004, 2006, and 2014.  More than 800 School Principals and senior faculty from all over South India have participated in these conferences.  Such conferences are rarely conducted by Schools in India.

LRIS follows the Central Board of Secondary Education (CBSE) and uses English as the medium of instruction. With 5199 students, it is one of the largest schools in the region and is optionally residential. School buses transport children and staff from a radius of 25 to 30  km daily to and from the School. The School owns 45+ buses.

Achievements 
Computer Literacy Excellence Award 2002

National recognition to Little Rock came in the form of the Computer Literacy Excellence Award of the Ministry of Information Technology, Government of India. Little Rock has adjudged the best school in computer education in Karnataka State. The President of India Dr. APJ Abdul Kalam presented the award to the Principal in August 2002. The school itself has won the National school sanitation award, an award from the HRD ministry, Govt. of India. The HRD minister Dr. Pallam Raju presented the award to the vice principal on 28 November 2012 at a glittering function in New Delhi.

Infrastructure 
 Three libraries, with around 46,000 books and 500 seats
 Science and Technology library
 Three Computer Centers with 125 computers each
 Another Computer Center exclusively for teachers, with 12 systems
 Three audio-visual halls, with LCD projectors, TV, and VCR
 Two Smartboard Rooms
 Science and mathematics laboratories
 Art and craft rooms
 Seminar hall
 Playground, with facilities for games 
 Reprographic Centre for in-house printing jobs.
 Science park
 A separate building for tiny tots - The Kindergarten
 Hostel facility for boys and girls

Extra-curricular
The school has a community room called The Beehive for students' performances. An hour is set aside (called The Family Hour) where students perform skits, music, mimicry, plays, and songs.

The school has a mess where hostelers and day scholars can have their food. Rice, Sambhar, vegetables(in the form of tasty curries), and buttermilk are normally served on weekdays. However, special lunches are served during festivals which usually includes Payasam.

The school playground has facilities for cricket, volleyball, throwball, basketball, handball, and football. The school basketball and handball teams have brought laurels at CBSE meets.

References

https://www.daijiworld.com/news/newsDisplay.aspx?newsID=451164

External links 
Official website of the school

 Primary schools in Karnataka
 High schools and secondary schools in Karnataka
 Schools in Udupi district
 Educational institutions established in 1982
1982 establishments in Karnataka